Almgården is a neighbourhood, situated in the Borough of Öster, Malmö, Malmö Municipality, Skåne County, Sweden.

References

Neighbourhoods of Malmö